Chennamaneni Ramesh (born 3 February 1956) is an Indian politician. He is an MLA representing the Vemulawada constituency in the Telangana Legislative Assembly from the Telangana Rashtra Samithi party.

Early life 
Chennamaneni Ramesh was born on 3 February 1956 in Karimnagar. His father Rajeshwara Rao (1923 – 2016) was a communist leader. His uncle C. Vidyasagar Rao served as the Governor of Maharashtra.

Ramesh completed his M.Sc. (Agriculture) at Leipzig, and obtained his Ph.D. from Humboldt University of Berlin in 1987.

Political career 
Ramesh began his political career in 2009 when he was elected as an MLA from Vemulawada constituency representing the Telugu Desam Party in Andhra Pradesh Legislative Assembly.

In 2010, he joined the Telangana Rashtra Samithi and was re-elected in a 2010 bypoll. He was re-elected to the  Telangana Legislative Assembly in 2014 and 2018.

Citizenship issue 
Ramesh moved to Germany in the 1990s for employment. He obtained German citizenship in 1993 and surrendered his Indian passport. He returned to India in 2008 and re-applied for the Indian citizenship which was granted by the Ministry of Home Affairs (MHA).

In 2013, Hyderabad High Court annulled Ramesh's candidature to the assembly based on the case filed by his opponent Adi Srinivas, who alleged that Ramesh obtained citizenship by submitting fake documents. However, Ramesh appealed to the Supreme Court of India and obtained a stay.

In December 2017, the Union government has cancelled Ramesh's citizenship but the Hyderabad High Court directed the MHA to re-examine based on Ramesh's appeal. The MHA re-iterated the same in 2019 by issuing a fresh order but Ramesh obtained a stay order from the High Court. In August 2021, the High Court noted that a by-election would be required if the charges on Ramesh's German citizenship were proven.

Personal life
Ramesh married Maria, a German citizen. The couple has 2 sons and a daughter.

References 

Living people
1956 births
Telangana politicians
Telangana Rashtra Samithi politicians
Telangana MLAs 2014–2018
Telangana MLAs 2018–2023
Andhra Pradesh MLAs 2009–2014
People from Karimnagar
Humboldt University of Berlin alumni